Larissa Meijer (born 15 July 1990, Eindhoven) is a Dutch field hockey player who plays as a goalkeeper. Meijer was a member of Netherlands women's national field hockey team that won the 2014 Women's Hockey World Cup. Meijer's Dutch club team is Oranje Zwart.

References

1990 births
Living people
Dutch female field hockey players
Female field hockey goalkeepers
Sportspeople from Eindhoven
20th-century Dutch women
21st-century Dutch women